is a Japanese international school located in Auderghem, Brussels. The school serves elementary and junior high school levels. It is Belgium's only Japanese international school. The , a supplementary school operated on Saturdays, is held on the premises of the JSB.

The presence of the school has drawn Japanese families with school-aged children to the area around the school. Marie Conte-Helm, author of The Japanese and Europe: Economic and Cultural Encounters, wrote that the school "acts as a focal point for all local Japanese." Chin Ling Pang, the author of Negotiating Identity in Contemporary Japan: The Case of Kikokushijo, wrote that the Japanese School of Brussels "functions as a microcosm of the Japanese community in Brussels."

As of 2000 the school's funding comes from Japanese companies and the Ministry of Education of Japan (Monbusho) in an equal proportion, along with tuition fees paid by parents of Saturday school pupils. Revenue in 2019–2020 school year was 2,085,580 euros with expenses being 1,721,896 euros.

History
A Japanese Saturday school opened in 1974. The Brussels Nihonjinkai took control of a facility in Auderghem in 1979 and founded the school. The school opened in April 1979.

Programme and curriculum
The Japanese Ministry of Education sends teachers to the school; as of 1998 20 teachers originated from Japan.

In addition the school has a curriculum that is used in schools in Japan. The school receives schoolbooks mailed from Japan. The students take mathematics, standard history, comparative history, French, English, geography, calligraphy, art, and home economics. The geography and standard history courses are centred on Japan. The home economics course includes childcare, gardening, sewing, food preparation, and crafts.

The Saturday school offers courses in Japanese and mathematics.

Student body
In 1995 the day school had 323 students, including 252 in elementary school and 71 in junior high school. Of the total number of students, 146 were males and 177 were females. In 1998 there were 276 students. In 2005 the school had 320 day students; two of them were Americans learning Japanese while the remainder were Japanese. In 2008 the school had 399 students; this was its peak enrollment. In 2013 the day school had 295 students and the Saturday school had 279 students in 2021. That year the Japanese ambassador to Belgium described the enrollment as having "decreased considerably".

As of 2000 students of the Saturday school were resident in several cities, including Brussels, Antwerp, Ostend, Valenciennes, Aachen and Maastricht. The students of the Saturday programme come from mixed and expatriate families.

As of 2005 most students return to Japan after completing their term at the JSB while some attend international schools in Brussels.

Facility
The campus, inside a residential area, and in proximity to the Beaulieu Station of the Brussels Metro, houses a building that is two stories tall. It can house a maximum of 500 students. As of 2005 the school's facility had 15 classrooms, a library, a science room, a music classroom, an indoor gymnasium, and four language laboratories. In 2010 funding was provided for an expansion for the school. It was scheduled to be completed around 2013. That year the Japanese Ambassador to Belgium described the facility as "a spacious campus".

Japanese cherry trees are planted on the grounds.

Extracurricular activities
The school organizes field trips to several places including the Royal Museum for Central Africa and the Centre for Fine Arts, Brussels.

See also

 Japanese community of Brussels
 Belgian Japanese

References

Further reading
 
 Hirose, Yumiko (廣瀬 由美子 Hirose Yumiko; 国立特殊教育総合研究所教育支援研究部). "ベルギー・ブラッセル日本人学校への教育相談" (Archive). 世界の特殊教育 20, 67–71, 2006–03. National Institute of Special Needs Education (独立行政法人国立特別支援教育総合研究所). See profile at CiNii.
 小川 裕之 (前ブラッセル日本人学校教諭・山口県立光市島田小学校教諭). "ブラッセル日本人学校における国際理解教育の実践 : 現地理解と美術教育を通して." 在外教育施設における指導実践記録 24, 106–110, 2001. Tokyo Gakugei University. See profile at CiNii.
 白崎 友久 (前ブラッセル日本人学校:京都市教育委員会生徒指導課). "ブラッセル日本人学校における外国語会話指導に関する考察 : 日本の学校での活用に向けて (第4章 総合的な学習)." 在外教育施設における指導実践記録 32, 69–72, 2009-10-12. Tokyo Gakugei University. See profile at CiNii.
 須藤 聡 (ブラッセル日本人学校・熊本大学教育学部附属小学校(前)). "ブラッセル日本人学校における外国語会話学習 : 現地採用外国語講師との連携について(第1章共同研究員報告)." 在外教育施設における指導実践記録 27, 3–6, 2004. Tokyo Gakugei University. See profile at CiNii.
 吉武 敏雄 (熊本大学教育学部附属養護学校・ブラッセル日本人学校(前)) "在外教育施設における特別支援教育 : ブラッセル日本人学校マロニエ学級の取り組み(第8章その他)." 在外教育施設における指導実践記録 27, 121–124, 2004. Tokyo Gakugei University. See profile at CiNii.
 金子 哲也. "海外あちらこちら ベルギーブラッセル日本人学校にて." 教育じほう (626), 88–90, 2000–03. 東京都新教育研究会. See profile at CiNii.
 小嶋 忠行. "海外日本人学校における現地理解教育のあり方について--ブラッセル日本人学校を例にして." Annual report of educational research (京都教育大学教育実践研究年報) (12), 233–247, 1996–03. 京都教育大学教育学部附属教育実践研究指導センター. See profile at CiNii.

External links
 The Japanese School of Brussels 
 "Japanese School of Brussels Junior high" (Archive)
 JSB Dousoukai (ＪＳＢ同窓会) 

International schools in Brussels
Brussels
1979 establishments in Belgium
Educational institutions established in 1979
Brussels
The Japanese School of Brussels
Secondary schools in Brussels